The Channel Islands slender salamander (Batrachoseps pacificus) is a species of salamander in the family Plethodontidae.

Distribution and habitat
It is endemic to  chaparral and woodlands, temperate forests, temperate shrubland, and temperate grassland on the Channel Islands of California.

References

Batrachoseps
Salamander
Salamander
Fauna of the Channel Islands of California
Fauna of the California chaparral and woodlands
Taxonomy articles created by Polbot
Amphibians described in 1865